Thomas Zaslavsky (born 1945) is an American mathematician specializing in combinatorics.

Zaslavsky's mother Claudia Zaslavsky was a high school mathematics teacher and an ethnomathematician in New York; his father Sam Zaslavsky (from Manhattan) was an electrical engineer. Thomas Zaslavsky graduated from the City College of New York. At M.I.T. he studied hyperplane arrangements with Curtis Greene and received a Ph.D. in 1974. In 1975 the American Mathematical Society published his doctoral thesis.

Zaslavsky has been a professor of mathematics at the Binghamton University, New York since 1985. He has published papers on matroid theory and hyperplane arrangements. He has also written on coding theory, lattice point counting, and Sperner theory. Zaslavsky has made available a bibliography on signed graphs and their applications.

Select publications

References

 
  Thomas Zaslavsky's homepage
 Microsoft academic search

Graph theorists
The Bronx High School of Science alumni
Massachusetts Institute of Technology School of Science alumni
Binghamton University faculty
1945 births
Living people